Christopher Gabardi (born 25 July 1969) is an Australian actor. He attended Wesley College, Melbourne (was School Captain in 1987) prior to graduating from Australia's National Institute of Dramatic Art (NIDA) with a degree in Performing Arts (Acting) in 1991. He is best known for his role as Dr. Vincent Hughes on Australian TV drama All Saints and the starring role in the sitcom Newlyweds. Gabardi also narrates the factual television series Medical Emergency.

He also portrayed Father Flynn in Sydney Theatre Company's production of Doubt to critical acclaim. He has been nominated for a Helpman Award and Green Room awards for roles in Melbourne Theatre Company productions.

After four years, Gabardi left All Saints and began the online ordering company 'MunchMonitor' which is classed as "an easy way for parents and students to order from school canteens, uniform shops and other school services online."

Gabardi married his wife Hali in 2003 and is the father of two children – Luca (2005) and Mila (2008).

Filmography
 All Saints as Vincent Hughes
 Stingers as Dawson Lynch and Rick Fairchild
 Marshall Law as David
 The Secret Life of Us as Jack
 State Coroner  as Senior Const. Daniel Ferris
 Blue Heelers as Brett Alcott
 The Thorn Birds: The Missing Years as Father Angelo
 Snowy River: The McGregor Saga as Tuck
 Newlyweds as Peter Roberts
 Hey Dad..! as Steve
 My Pet Dinosaur as EPA Agent, Fred Tansy

Recent work
Gabardi stars in the feature film, My Pet Dinosaur (2017) directed by Matt Drummond.

External links

1969 births
Australian male television actors
Living people
People educated at Wesley College (Victoria)
National Institute of Dramatic Art alumni